is a Japanese mail-order retailer of lingerie and women's apparel targeted at women in their teens and 20s.

History 
The company was founded 1 June 1994 by Mika Noguchi and her now ex-husband, Shoji Noguchi, in Tokyo, Japan. Mika Noguchi, then 29 years old, established a small mail-order company importing American lingerie.

The name Peach John (ピーチ・ジョン Pīchi Jon) is inspired by the Japanese folktale hero Momotarō (桃太郎), with Momo (桃) translating as "peach", and Tarō (太郎) being a masculine given name as common as John. Mika Noguchi desired a name beginning with the letter P as she found the pī (ピー) sound to be "cute".

As the company continued to expand its product line, in 2001 Peach John nearly succumbed to bankruptcy. After restructuring, the company was able to pay back their 2 billion yen debt in 13 months. In May 2006, the Japanese lingerie maker Wacoal formed a capital alliance with Peach John which allowed Wacoal to hold 49 percent of the company's shares. Then on 10 January 2008, Wacoal bought Noguchi's remaining shares, giving Wacoal full control of Peach John Co., Ltd.

Collaborations 
On occasion, Peach John has collaborated with Bandai on items to mark milestone anniversaries of anime/manga franchises:

 Sailor Moon lingerie and pajamas, including costume lingerie sets based on Sailor Soldier outfits, in celebration of the franchise's 20th anniversary.
 Neon Genesis Evangelion lingerie and pajamas inspired by the franchise's various characters in celebration of the franchise's 20th anniversary.

References

External links
  

Wacoal
Clothing brands of Japan
Clothing retailers of Japan
Clothing companies established in 1994
Retail companies established in 1994
Lingerie brands